XEQR-FM is a radio station in Mexico City. Located on 107.3 MHz, XEQR-FM is owned by Grupo Radio Centro and carries a grupera format as "La Z".

XEQR-FM was Mexico's top-rated radio station from 1999 to 2017.

History
XEQR took to the air in 1974 — more than 10 years after receiving its concession on December 3, 1963 — with the name "Radio Universal" and a format of music in English from the 1950s and 1960s. In 1991, it became known as "Universal Stereo 107.3 FM" and picked up the long-running "El Club de los Beatles" program from XERC-AM, which ceased airing it when that station dropped the Radio Éxitos format.

On December 7, 1998, XEQR and XHFO-FM engaged in a format swap. XEQR picked up the grupera format "La Z" which had started its run on XHFO in 1993, while Universal Stereo moved to XHFO.

References

Radio stations established in 1974
Radio stations in Mexico City
1974 establishments in Mexico
Grupo Radio Centro